Mustn't Grumble may refer to;

 Mustn't Grumble, a 1981 album by Chas & Dave
 Mustn't Grumble, a 1993 book by cartoonist Posy Simmonds
 Mustn't Grumble: An Accidental Return to England, a 2006 travel book by Joe Bennett
 Mustn't Grumble, a 2006 autobiography by Terry Wogan